Ignacio 'Iñaki' Eraña Cassi (born 3 June 1965) is a Spanish former footballer who played as a midfielder, and is a manager.

Club career
Born in Gijón, Asturias, Eraña started his career with local Sporting de Gijón, making his debut on 3 October 1984 and scoring the fourth goal in a 6–1 win over Club Siero in the first round of the Copa del Rey. He signed his first professional contract in 1986, but was loaned to Segunda División club Recreativo de Huelva in January of the following year.

Eraña subsequently returned to Sporting, playing three consecutive seasons in La Liga before being loaned to Real Murcia in the second tier. He made his debut in the former competition on 1 November 1987, coming on as a late substitute in a 1–1 away draw against Valencia CF.

From 1992 until his retirement, at the age of 34, Eraña represented CD Logroñés, SD Compostela, CF Extremadura and CD Numancia, with six of the campaigns being spent in the top flight. He also achieved promotion from division two with the third and fourth sides.

After retiring, Eraña worked with Sporting Gijón in directorial capacities, leaving his post in January 2015. In October of that year he started his coaching career by being appointed at local amateurs UC Ceares, leaving the team at the end of the season.

Personal life
Eraña's father, Juan (born 1938), was also a footballer. He too represented Sporting, making over 200 appearances for the club in the 1960s and helping them win promotion to the top tier in 1969–70. 

Two of Juan's older brothers, Jaime and Felipe, played for Sestao Sport Club in their native Basque Country during the 50s.

References

External links

1965 births
Living people
Spanish people of Basque descent
Footballers from Gijón
Spanish footballers
Association football midfielders
La Liga players
Segunda División players
Segunda División B players
Sporting de Gijón B players
Sporting de Gijón players
Recreativo de Huelva players
Real Murcia players
CD Logroñés footballers
SD Compostela footballers
CF Extremadura footballers
CD Numancia players
Spanish football managers
Tercera División managers